The Social Liberal Party, abbreviated to PSL, is an opposition liberal political party in Tunisia. The party is a member of the Liberal International and the Africa Liberal Network.

The party was founded in September 1988 under the name "Social Party for Progress", but was renamed in October 1993 to reflect its liberal ideology.  At the 1999 election, it won election for the first time, winning its first two seats in the Chamber of Deputies.

They retained these two seats at the 2004, when its candidate Mohamed Mouni Béji also won 0.8% at the presidential elections.  In 2005, Mongi Khamassi, one of the party's founders, split to form the Green Party for Progress.  Despite this, the PSL quadrupled its seats to eight in the 2009 election, making it the fifth-largest party.

As well as liberal social and political reforms, the PSL advocates economic liberalisation, including the privatisation of state-owned firms.

See also
Liberalism
Social liberalism
Contributions to liberal theory
Liberalism worldwide
List of liberal parties
Liberal democracy

Notes

External links
Social Liberal Party archived official site

1988 establishments in Tunisia
Liberal International
Liberal parties in Tunisia
Political parties established in 1988
Political parties in Tunisia